Film1 Family (formerly known as Film1.2 and Film1 Comedy & Kids) is a Dutch premium television channel owned by SPI International. Its main focus is on comedy and children films. Film1 launched together with its sister service Sport1 on 1 February 2006 and replaced the Canal+ Netherlands television channels. Film1 offers multiple channels with Dutch and international film and television series productions. Film1.2 rebranded into Film1 Family on 25 February 2011. Film1 Family changed into Film1 Comedy & Kids on 6 September 2013 but on 1 September 2016 it changed back to Film1 Family.

The channel is available on most digital cable and IPTV providers, and satellite provider CanalDigitaal. DVB-T provider Digitenne does not provide Film1.

See also
 Film1
 Television in the Netherlands
 Digital television in the Netherlands

External links
 film1.nl 
 alleenopeen.tv

References

Television channels in the Netherlands
SPI International
Television channels and stations established in 2006
Mass media in Amsterdam